The following is a list of notable deaths in June 2007.

Entries for each day are listed alphabetically by surname. A typical entry lists information in the following sequence:
 Name, age, country of citizenship at birth, subsequent country of citizenship (if applicable), reason for notability, cause of death (if known), and reference.

June 2007

1
 Warren M. Anderson, 91, American legislator, Temporary President and Majority Leader of the NY Senate (1973–1989).
 Jan Beneš, 71, Czech writer, translator, publicist and screenwriter, suicide. (Czech)
 Kasma Booty, 75, Malaysian actress, pneumonia.
 Sir John Gilmour, 94, British Conservative MP for East Fife (1961–1979) and Lord Lieutenant of Fife (1980–1987).
 Charles Johnson, 58, American basketball player, cancer.
 Charles Kinkead, 93, Jamaican photojournalist, stroke.
 Pamela Low, 79, American flavorist who created the coating for Cap'n Crunch.
 Marly de Oliveira, 69, Brazilian poet ("O Mar de Permeio"), multiple organ failure. (Portuguese)
 Arn Shein, 78, American sports writer.
 Dave Smalley, 72, American coach of US Naval Academy men's and women's basketball teams, complications of cancer.
 Tony Thompson, 31, American lead vocalist of the R&B group Hi-Five, toxic inhalation of freon.

2
 Sandy Barr, 69, American professional wrestler, heart attack.
 Marion Francis Forst, 96, American oldest Roman Catholic bishop in the United States.
 Steve Gilliard, 42, American blogger, heart and kidney failure.
 Kentaro Haneda, 58, Japanese pianist, composer and arranger, liver cancer.
 Wolfgang Hilbig, 65, German author and poet.
Huang Ju, 68, Chinese Vice Premier, Politburo Standing Committee member, former Mayor of Shanghai.
 Martin Meyerson, 84, American academic, President of Penn (1971–1982) and Chancellor of UC Berkeley. 
 John Moriarty, 69, Irish poet and philosopher, cancer.

3
 Richard Attipoe, 50, Togolese Minister for Sport, helicopter crash.
 Ivan Darvas, 82, Hungarian actor. 
 Ragheed Ganni, 35, Iraqi Chaldean Catholic priest, shot.
 Earl Hogan, 87, American politician, U.S. Representative from Indiana (1959–1961).
James Arthur Kelsey, 54, American Bishop of the Episcopal Diocese of Northern Michigan, automobile accident.
 Nelson Levy, 58, Tahitian founding head of Air Tahiti Nui, leading figure in French Polynesian tourism, heart attack.
 Leonard Nathan, 82, American poet, National Book Award nominee, UC Berkeley professor of rhetoric, Alzheimer's disease.
Juan Antonio Arguelles Rius, 28, Spanish songwriter and programmer, traffic collision. (Spanish)

4
 Clete Boyer, 70, American baseball player (New York Yankees, Atlanta Braves) and coach, stroke.
 Tom Burns, 75, Australian politician, former Queensland opposition leader, Deputy Premier and Australian Labor Party national president.
Lady Jeanne Campbell, 78, British journalist and aristocrat.
 Jim Clark, 84, American sheriff of Dallas County, Alabama who opposed voting rights in Selma, stroke and heart condition.
 Hallie Ford, 102, American timber entrepreneur and philanthropist.
 Bill France Jr., 74, American CEO of NASCAR (1972–2003), cancer.
 Wallace McIntosh, 87, British World War II air gunner.
 Sotiris Moustakas, 67, Greek Cypriot actor, cancer.
 Freddie Scott, 74, American singer ("Hey Girl"), heart attack.
 Craig L. Thomas, 74, American Senator from Wyoming since 1995, leukemia.

5
 Sam Baker, 76, American football player, complications of diabetes.
 Gert-Jan Dröge, 64, Dutch TV personality, lung cancer.
 Povel Ramel, 85, Swedish artist, singer, pianist, comedian, actor, author.
 Jean Vollum, 80, American philanthropist and widow of Tektronix founder Howard Vollum, congestive heart failure.

6
Lila Irene Clerides, 85, Indian-born Cypriot actress and socialite, First Lady (1974, 1993-2003).
 Tony De Santis, 93, American owner of Drury Lane Theatre, cancer.
 Enrique Fuentes Quintana, 82, Spanish economist and politician, Deputy Prime Minister (1977–1979). 
 Larry Hamlin, 58, American theater producer, founder of the National Black Theater Festival.
 Dave Hancock, 68, English footballer.
 Luke Sela, 64, Papua New Guinean journalist, editor of the PNG Post Courier (1978–2000).
Zakia Zaki, 35, Afghan director of Radio Peace, shot.

7
 Gilbert Gude, 84, United States Representative from Maryland (1967–1977), heart failure.
 Michael Hamburger, 83, German-born British poet, translator, critic.
 Sahar Hussein al-Haideri, 44, Iraqi journalist, shot.

8
Martin Buckmaster, 3rd Viscount Buckmaster, 86, English diplomat. 
 Hideo Kanze, 79, Japanese Noh actor and director, intestinal cancer.
 Nellie Lutcher, 94, American jazz singer and pianist, pneumonia.
 Kenny Olsson, 30, Swedish speedway rider, crash.
 Aden Abdulle Osman, 99, Somali politician, first President of Somalia (1960–1967).
 Lynne Randell, 57, Australian singer ("Ciao Baby"), apparent suicide.
 Richard Rorty, 75, American philosopher, pancreatic cancer.

9
Frankie Abernathy, 25, American cast member of The Real World: San Diego, cystic fibrosis.
Rudolf Arnheim, 102, German-born American author, psychologist, and theorist of film and visual art. 
Lorne Carr, 96, Canadian NHL hockey player for the New York Rangers and Toronto Maple Leafs.
Eddie Crush, 90, English cricketer (Kent) (1946–1949).
Bill Ellis, 87, English cricketer (Nottinghamshire).
Harry Ewing, Baron Ewing of Kirkford, 76, British Labour politician, cancer.
Rob Goode, 80, American football player for the Washington Redskins.
Achieng Oneko, 87, Kenyan freedom fighter and politician, heart attack.
Ousmane Sembène, 84, Senegalese film director, producer and writer, after long illness.
Elias Wen, 110, Chinese-born Protopresbyter (senior clergy) of the Russian Orthodox Church.
Leonard E. H. Williams, 87, British World War II Spitfire pilot and businessman.

10
August H. Auer Jr., 67, American-born New Zealand atmospheric scientist and meteorologist, heart attack.
George Burrarrawanga, 50, Australian singer (Warumpi Band).
Charley Harper, 84, American wildlife artist, pneumonia.
Jim Killingsworth, 83, American college basketball coach (Idaho State, Oklahoma State, TCU), complications from stroke.
Laurence Mancuso, 72, American founding abbot of Monks of New Skete, complications of injuries from a fall.
John Ostashek, 71, Canadian Yukon Party Leader (1992–1999) and Yukon Government Leader (1992–1996), cancer.
Parviz Varjavand, 73, Iranian archaeologist, heart failure.

11
Bobby Beaton, 94, Canadian ice hockey player, professional boxer and boxing referee.
Eamonn Coleman, 59, Northern Irish Gaelic football coach (Derry GAA), non-Hodgkin lymphoma. 
Vern Hoscheit, 85, American Major League Baseball bullpen coach.
Ray Mears, 80, American basketball coach of the University of Tennessee Volunteers (1963–1977).
Mala Powers, 75, American film actress (Cyrano de Bergerac, Outrage), leukemia.

12
Donald D. Clancy, 85, American Mayor of Cincinnati (1957–1960), US Representative from Ohio (1961–1977), Parkinson's disease.
 Colin Fletcher, 85, American writer on hiking, complications of old age and injuries from a 2001 car accident.
Tito Gómez, 59, Puerto Rican salsa singer, former member of Ray Barretto and Sonora Ponceña bands, heart attack.
Don Herbert, 89, American TV host ("Mr. Wizard"), bone cancer.
Sir Wally Herbert, 72, British polar explorer.
Jim Norton, 68, American football player (Houston Oilers, 1960–1969).
Guy de Rothschild, 98, French banker and member of the Rothschild family.
Frank Scarrabelotti, 109, Australia's oldest living man.
Samuel Isaac Weissman, 94, American chemist known for his work on the Manhattan Project.

13
 Jessie Davis, 26, American murder victim.
Walid Eido, 65, Lebanese politician, bomb.
Sir David Hatch, 68, British managing director of BBC Radio, comic actor (I'm Sorry, I'll Read That Again).
Oskar Morawetz, 90, Canadian classical composer.
Claude Netter, 82, French Olympic fencer.
Néstor Rossi, 82, Argentine footballer, played in 1958 FIFA World Cup.
John Stanton Ward, 89, British artist.

14
Ruth Graham, 87, American wife of evangelist Billy Graham.
William LeMessurier, 81, American structural engineer, complications from surgery following a fall.
Jørgen Hare, 83, Danish Olympic shooter.
Martin McKay, 70, Irish Olympic cyclist.
Robin Olds, 84, American fighter pilot in the United States Air Force, heart failure.
Jacques Simonet, 43, Belgian politician and mayor of Anderlecht, heart attack. (Dutch)
Alex Thomson, 78, British cinematographer (Excalibur, Alien 3, Labyrinth).
Larry Whiteside, 69, American baseball journalist.
Peter Ucko, 68, British archaeologist, complications of diabetes.
Kurt Waldheim, 88, Austrian President (1986–1992), UN Secretary-General (1972–1981), World War II Wehrmacht officer, heart failure.

15
Richard Bell, 61, Canadian keyboardist for Janis Joplin and The Band, cancer.
Bertin Borna, 76, Beninese politician, former finance minister.
Claudia Cohen, 56, American socialite and journalist, ovarian cancer.
Hugo Corro, 53, Argentine World Boxing Association and World Boxing Council middleweight boxing champion (1978–1979). (Spanish) 
Sherri Martel, 49, American professional wrestler and valet, accidental overdose.

16
Robin Beard, 67, American Representative from Tennessee (1973–1983), brain tumor.
Jack Doohan, 87, Australian politician, Member of the New South Wales Legislative Council (1978–1991).
Norman Hackerman, 95, American former president of the University of Texas at Austin and Rice University, heart disease.
Grand Ayatollah Fazel Lankarani, 76, Iranian religious leader.
Thommie Walsh, 57, American dancer (A Chorus Line) and Tony Award-winning choreographer, lymphoma.
Lola Wasserstein, 89, American mother of playwright Wendy Wasserstein who inspired some of her daughter's characters.

17
Jamal Abdul Karim al-Dabban, 68, Iraqi Sunni religious leader, heart attack.
Ben Brocklehurst, 85, British cricketer and publisher.
 Cheng Shifa, 86, Chinese painter, cartoonist and calligrapher.
Angelo Felici, 87, Italian Catholic Cardinal, President Emeritus of the Pontifical Commission Ecclesia Dei.
 Gianfranco Ferré, 62, Italian fashion designer, brain haemorrhage.
 Ed Friendly, 85, American television producer (Little House on the Prairie, Rowan & Martin's Laugh-In), cancer.
Velimir Ilić, 81, Yugoslav Olympic athlete.
 Jay Newman, 59, Canadian philosopher, cancer.
 José Abílio Osório Soares, 60, Indonesian last governor of East Timor.
 Fred C. Stinson, 84, Canadian politician.

18
Bill Barber, 87, American jazz tuba player, played with Miles Davis and John Coltrane, heart failure.
Vilma Espín, 77, Cuban wife of acting President Raúl Castro, president of Cuban Women's Federation.
Kenneth Franklin, 84, American astronomer at the Hayden Planetarium.
Tung Hua Lin, 96, Chinese engineer, designed China's first twin-engine aircraft, heart failure.
Bernard Manning, 76, British comedian, kidney failure.
Hank Medress, 68, American singer (The Tokens), producer of The Chiffons and Tony Orlando and Dawn, lung cancer.
 Georges Thurston, 55, Canadian author and composer known as "Boule Noire" (Afro), colorectal cancer.
 Cheves Walling, 91, American organic chemist.

19
Antonio Aguilar, 88, Mexican actor, pneumonia.
Victorio Cieslinskas, 84, Uruguayan Olympic bronze medal-winning (1952) basketball player. 
Tommy Eytle, 80, Guyanese-born British actor and jazz musician.
El Fary, 69, Spanish singer, lung cancer. 
Terry Hoeppner, 59, American football coach for Indiana University, brain tumor.
Antanas Karoblis, 67, Lithuanian politician.
Piara Khabra, 82, British Labour MP for Ealing, Southall (1992–2007).
Alberto Mijangos, 81, Mexican-American painter, lymphoma.
Ze'ev Schiff, 74, Israeli military journalist, heart disease.
Klausjürgen Wussow, 78, German actor (Schwarzwaldklinik), after long illness.

20
Nazik Al-Malaika, 84, Iraqi poet, old age.
Rudy Autio, 80, American sculptor, leukemia.
Shayne Bower, 42, Canadian professional wrestler known as "Biff Wellington", heart attack.
Jerry Fleishman, 85, American basketball player (Philadelphia Warriors).
Anita Guha, Indian actress, heart failure.
J.B. Handelsman, 85, American cartoonist for The New Yorker, lung cancer.
Margaret Helfland, 59, American architect and urban planner, colon cancer.
Trevor Henry, 105, New Zealand Supreme Court justice.
Mamadou Konte, 65, Senegalese music producer, founder of the Africa Fete music festival and record label. (French)
Jim Shoulders, 79, American Pro Rodeo Hall of Famer, heart ailment.

21
Georg Danzer, 60, Austrian singer, lung cancer. (German)
Bob Evans, 89, American founder of Bob Evans Restaurants, pneumonia.
Douglas Hill, 72, Canadian author.
Peter Liba, 67, Canadian Lieutenant-Governor of Manitoba (1999–2004).
Carlos Romero, 80, American character actor Falcon Crest.
Marshall Shulman, 91, American Sovietologist who founded the Averell Harriman Institute at Columbia University.
Mary Ellen Solt, 86, American poet and critic, stroke.

22
 Bernd Becher, 75, German photographer, complications of heart surgery.
Nancy Benoit, 43, American professional wrestler and manager, wife of wrestler Chris Benoit, murder by strangulation.
 Daniel Benoit, 7, Son of Chris Benoit and Nancy Benoit, murder by strangulation.
 Eleanor Emery, 88, British diplomat, High Commissioner to Botswana.
 Luciano Fabro, 70, Italian artist and theorist in Arte Povera movement, heart attack.
 Lenar Gilmullin, 22, Russian footballer (FC Rubin Kazan), motorcycle accident. 
 William L. Hungate, 84, American judge, U.S. Representative (1964–1977), complications of surgery.
 Jack Ormston, 97, British speedway rider.
 Erik Parlevliet, 43, Dutch field hockey player, after long illness. 
 Guy Vander Jagt, 75, United States Representative from Michigan (1966–1993), pancreatic cancer.

23
Rod Beck, 38, American Major League Baseball pitcher. 
Hou Yaowen, 59, Chinese xiangsheng (cross-talk) actor, heart attack.
Hans Sennholz, 85, German-born economist.
Nguyen Chanh Thi, 84, Vietnamese general for South Vietnam during the Vietnam War.

24
Byron Baer, 77, American legislator for New Jersey (1971–2005), heart failure.
Gillian Baverstock, 75, British novelist, daughter of Enid Blyton.
 Chris Benoit, 40, Canadian professional wrestler, suicide by hanging.
Edouard Brunner, 75, Swiss diplomat and United Nations mediator.
Derek Dougan, 69, Northern Irish footballer (Wolves, Northern Ireland).
Jack Flynt, 92, United States Representative from Georgia (1954–1979).
Léon Jeck, 60, Belgian footballer (Standard Liège, national team). (French)
Robert Kroon, 82, Dutch journalist, pancreatic cancer.
Charles W. Lindberg, 86, American last surviving marine who raised the first flag on Mount Suribachi during the Battle of Iwo Jima.
Natasja Saad, 32, Danish rapper, car accident. 
Joey Sadler, 92, New Zealand All Blacks rugby union player.
Joy Simonson, 88, American feminist, complications of pneumonia.
Maurice Wood, 90, British Anglican Bishop of Norwich (1971–1985).

25
 Jurgis Blekaitis, 89, Lithuanian-American poet and theatre producer, Alzheimer's disease.
 Alida Bosshardt, 94, Dutch "public face" of the Salvation Army. 
 Dana Bullen, 75, American journalist and advocate for freedom of the press, cancer.
 Liliane Chappuis, 51, Swiss member of the National Council, heart attack. (French)
 J. Fred Duckett, 74, American sports announcer and teacher, leukemia.
Fasal al Gaood, Iraqi former governor of Al Anbar, Sunni tribal sheikh prominent in alliance against Al Qaeda, suicide bomb victim.
 Jeeva, 43, Indian director and cinematographer.
 Mahasti, 60, Iranian pop singer, colon cancer.
 Jan Herman Linge, 85, Norwegian boat designer, Soling and Yngling class.
 Bill Moss, 76, American gospel musician (The Celestials), emphysema.
 Adrian Mung'andu, 84, Zambian Catholic archbishop of Lusaka (1984–1996).
William O'Brien, 77, American politician, Minnesota State Auditor (1969–1971).
 Brenda Rawnsley, 90, British arts campaigner.
 Paul Smith, 85, American typewriter artist.

26
Tina Brozman, 54, American Bankruptcy Court judge, complications of ovarian cancer.
Liz Claiborne, 78, Belgian-born American fashion designer, cancer.
Jupp Derwall, 80, German football coach of West Germany (1978–1984), heart attack.
Lucien Hervé, 96, Hungarian-born French photographer, after long illness. (Hungarian)
Bobby Hussey, 67, American basketball coach at Virginia Tech and Davidson College.
Dame Thea King, 81, British clarinetist.
Luigi Meneghello, 85, Italian writer and essayist.
Malcolm Slesser, 80, British scientist and mountaineer, suspected heart attack while hillwalking.

27
Patrick Allotey, 28, Ghanaian footballer for Feyenoord and Ghana. (Dutch)
Kari Blackburn, 53, British broadcaster, suicide by drowning.
William Hutt, 87, Canadian actor, leukemia.
Hugh Johns, 83, British football commentator with ITV.
Jimmy Marks, 62, American Romani civil rights leader, heart attack.
Ashraf Marwan, 62, Egyptian son-in-law of former President Nasser, alleged double agent.
Emilio Ochoa, 99, Cuban who was last living signatory of the 1940 Constitution, cardiac arrest.
Ruslan Odizhev, 33, Russian former Guantanamo Bay detainee, shot by police. 
Silas Rhodes, 91, American educator, founder of the School of Visual Arts.
Dragutin Tadijanović, 101, Croatian author.

28
Inez Baskin, 91, American journalist, covered the Montgomery bus boycott.
Leo Burmester, 63, American actor (The Abyss, The Last Temptation of Christ, A Perfect World), leukemia.
Eugene B. Fluckey, 93, American submarine commander awarded the Medal of Honor during World War II.
Bruce R. Kennedy, 68, American businessman, former chairman and CEO of Alaska Airlines, light plane crash.
Abraham Klausner, 92, American rabbi, supporter of Holocaust survivors, complications of Parkinson's disease.
Kiichi Miyazawa, 87, Japanese Prime Minister (1991–1993), natural causes.
Thomas K. Mooney, 45, American diplomat and soldier.
Shinji Nakae, 72, Japanese voice actor and narrator.
Howie Schneider, 77, American cartoonist (Eek and Meek), complications of heart surgery.
Catherine Troeh, 96, American native people activist and historian.
Jess Weiss, 90, American anesthesiologist.
Maurice Wohl, 90, British property developer and philanthropist.

29
Frank W. Burke, 87, American politician, US Representative (1959–1963), Mayor of Louisville (1969–1973).
Raymond E. Douglas, 58, American executive with The New York Times, who helped add color to its pages, pulmonary embolism.
John Hansl, 82, Croatian ex-concentration camp guard whose United States citizenship was revoked in 2005, congestive heart failure.
Harry Henshel, 88, American watchmaker, last member of the Bulova family to head that company.
George McCorkle, 60, American guitarist with The Marshall Tucker Band, cancer.  
Fred Saberhagen, 77, American writer of Berserker series, cancer.
Joel Siegel, 63, American film critic for Good Morning America on ABC, colon cancer.
Alojzij Šuštar, 86, Slovenian former Archbishop of Ljubljana. 
Edward Yang, 59, Taiwanese film director (Yi Yi), colon cancer.

30
Gottfried von Bismarck, 44, German aristocrat, businessman and socialite, suspected heroin overdose.
Jim Corbett, 82, American politician, Mayor of Tucson, Arizona (1967–1971), Arizona legislator (1956–1958), heart problems.
Bruce Greensill, 65, Australian rugby union player and administrator, represented Auckland and Sydney.
Will Schaefer, 78, American composer of background music for I Dream of Jeannie and The Flintstones, cancer.
Robert E. Sweeney, 82, American politician, US Representative from Ohio (1965–1967), heart problems.
Sahib Singh Verma, 64, Indian Chief Minister of Delhi (1996–1998), Bharatiya Janata Party leader,  car accident.
Norman Williams, 92, Australian World War II air gunner.

References

2007-06
 06